Anna Forder (born May 25, 1951 in Oshawa, Ontario) is a Canadian former pair skater. With partner Richard Stephens, she competed in the 1968 Winter Olympics and won the gold medal at the Canadian Figure Skating Championships the next year.

Results
pairs with Richard Stephens

References

1951 births
Canadian female pair skaters
Figure skaters at the 1968 Winter Olympics
Olympic figure skaters of Canada
Living people
Sportspeople from Oshawa